Grootvlei Prison is situated just southwest of the city of Bloemfontein in South Africa.

References

Prisons in South Africa
Buildings and structures in the Free State (province)
Mangaung